Arabelly Orjuela Sánchez (born 24 July 1988 in Líbano) is a Colombian race walker. She competed in the 20 km kilometres event at the 2012 Summer Olympics.

Personal bests

Track walk
10,000 m: 46:21.88 min –  Barquisimeto, 9 June 2012
20,000 m: 1:32:48.7 hrs (ht) –  Buenos Aires, 5 June 2011

Road walk
20 km: 1:32:40 hrs –  Lima, 13 May 2017

Achievements

References

External links

Tilastopaja biography

People from Líbano, Tolima
Colombian female racewalkers
1988 births
Living people
Olympic athletes of Colombia
Athletes (track and field) at the 2012 Summer Olympics
Athletes (track and field) at the 2018 South American Games
South American Games silver medalists for Colombia
South American Games medalists in athletics
Athletes (track and field) at the 2011 Pan American Games
Pan American Games competitors for Colombia
21st-century Colombian women